Michael Dunwell (born 6 January 1980) is an English football manager and former professional player. He is the current manager of Northern Football League First Division side Stockton Town. In his playing career, he played as a forward for Hartlepool United, Bishop Auckland, Durham City, Billingham Synthonia, Norton & Stockton Ancients, Billingham Town, Northallerton Town and Stockton Town.

Early life
Dunwell was born and raised in the Stockton-on-Tees area.

Playing career
Dunwell began his career at Hartlepool United in 1996, and spent four seasons there, making one league appearance during the 1998–99 season. before going on to play for clubs such as Bishop Auckland, Durham City, Billingham Synthonia, Norton & Stockton Ancients, Billingham Town, Northallerton Town and Stockton Town.

Management career
Dunwell was a player-coach at Billingham Town and Stockton Town. He became Stockton Town first team manager in the summer of 2014, after retiring from his playing career. He appointed J.D. Briggs as his assistant manager; the duo had previously played together for many years and are long-time friends.

When Stockton qualified for the Northern Football League Second Division, he guided the club to automatic promotion to the first division, having finished as the second division champions. Stockton then gained promotion to the newly-formed Northern Premier League Division One East for the 2021–22 season, having finished as runners-up of the Northern League Division One for the 2020–21 season.

References

External links
 Michael Dunwell at Stockton Town F.C. Website

1980 births
Living people
Footballers from Stockton-on-Tees
Footballers from County Durham
English football managers
English footballers
Association football forwards
Hartlepool United F.C. players
Bishop Auckland F.C. players
Durham City A.F.C. players
Billingham Synthonia F.C. players
Norton & Stockton Ancients F.C. players
Billingham Town F.C. players
Northallerton Town F.C. players
Stockton Town F.C. players
Stockton Town F.C. managers